The Afghanistan cricket team toured Scotland in May 2019 to play two One Day International (ODI) matches. In April 2019, the Afghanistan Cricket Board (ACB) named Gulbadin Naib as the team's new ODI captain, replacing Asghar Afghan.

Afghanistan last visited Scotland in July 2016, winning a rain-affected two-match series 1–0. The two teams last played each other in an ODI in March 2018, during the 2018 Cricket World Cup Qualifier in Zimbabwe, with Scotland winning by seven wickets. The ODI fixtures were part of Afghanistan's preparation for the 2019 Cricket World Cup. As per the previous series in 2016, this series was also impacted by the weather, with Afghanistan winning 1–0, after the first match was abandoned.

Squads

Prior to the second ODI, Mujeeb Ur Rahman was added to Afghanistan's squad.

ODI series

1st ODI

2nd ODI

References

External links
 Series home at ESPN Cricinfo

2019 in Scottish cricket
2019 in Afghan cricket
International cricket competitions in 2019
Afghan cricket tours of Scotland
Afghanistan 2019